Christian Heinrich Postel (11 October 1658 – 22 March 1705) was a German jurist, epic poet and opera librettist, who wrote 28 libretti for the Oper am Gänsemarkt in Hamburg: set by composers such as Johann Philipp Förtsch, Reinhard Keiser and Georg Philipp Telemann. His texts for a St John Passion were set by composers Christian Ritter, Johann Mattheson and Johann Sebastian Bach in their respective St John Passion.

Career 

He studied law at the University of Leipzig from 1680 with Christian Thomasius. When the plague threatened Leipzig, he continued his studies at the University of Rostock, where he graduated as a licentiate on 10 May 1683. Their diary of the journey, "" (Description of a journey through the north-western Germany, to the Netherlands and England in the year 1683), not printed until the 19th century, shows their many interests, especially in foreign universities and libraries.

Back in Hamburg, he opened an office as a lawyer. Georg Philipp Telemann set his libretto of Sieg der Schönheit (Victory of beauty). He adapted Jean Galbert de Campistron's tragedy Achille et Polyxène for an opera by Lully and Colasse, premiered in 1687, as a  French-German cooperation unique in opera history. His opera libretto  ("St. Eugenia, or the conversion of Alexandria to Christianity"), was set by Johann Philipp Förtsch, premiered in 1688 and printed in 1695.

Around 1700, Postel wrote the libretto for an oratorio  (Passion and death of Jesus Christ, or St John Passion). A setting formerly attributed to George Frideric Handel is now believed to be by Christian Ritter. Another setting, called Das Lied des Lammes ("The Song of the Lamb") is by Johann Mattheson. Several parts of the text were used in Bach's St John Passion. While Postel is thought to have written all thirteen poetic pieces added to the Gospel text, it is certain only for three which were reprinted by Christian Friedrich Hunold, while "" is among the other ten. Ritter and Mattheson composed it as an aria, while Bach set it as a chorale on the melody of the hymn "Machs mit mir, Gott, nach deiner Güt" (Deal with me, God, according to your kindness). All three composers place it at the same position in the action, in the court hearing of Pilate.

Postel died in Hamburg of consumption.

Selected works 

 Jakob von Melle, Christian Henrich Postel: Beschreibung einer Reise durch das nordwestliche Deutschland, nach den Niederlanden und England im Jahre 1683. Aus einer Handschrift der Lübeckischen Stadtbibliothek herausgegeben von Oberlehrer Dr. Carl Curtius. Gebr. Borchers, Lübeck 1891 (Programm Lübeck Catharineum 1891), online.

Literature 

 Julius Elias: Postel, Christian Heinrich. In: Allgemeine Deutsche Biographie (ADB). Band 26, Duncker & Humblot, Leipzig 1888, S. 465–473.
 Dian Igor Lindberg: Literary Aspects of German Baroque Opera. History, theory, and practice (Christian Heinrich Postel and Barthold Feind). Diss. Univ. of California, Los Angeles 1964.
 Solveig Olsen: Christian Heinrich Postels Beitrag zur deutschen Literatur. Versuch einer Darstellung (= Amsterdamer Publikationen zur Sprache und Literatur 7, ISSN 0169-0221). Rodopi, Amsterdam 1973.
 Bodo Plachta: Postel, Christian Heinrich. In: Neue Deutsche Biographie (NDB). Band 20, Duncker & Humblot, Berlin 2001, S. 656 (Digitalisat).
 Erich Vilter: Die epische Technik in Chr. H. Postels Heldengedicht „Der grosse Wittekind“. Ein Beitrag zur Geschichte der Renaissanceepen. Kaestner, Göttingen 1899 (Dissertation, Universität Göttingen, 1898).

References

External links 

 
 Works digital Herzog August Bibliothek 

1658 births
1705 deaths
17th-century German lawyers
German librettists
German poets
Musicians from Hamburg
Jurists from Hanover
University of Rostock alumni
German male poets
People educated at the Gelehrtenschule des Johanneums
People from Stade (district)